The 1988 Afro-Asian Club Championship, was the 3rd Afro-Asian Club Championship competition endorsed by the Confederation of African Football (CAF) and Asian Football Confederation (AFC), contested between the winners of the African Champions' Cup and the Asian Club Championship.

The final was contested in two-legged home-and-away format between Japanese team Yomiuri the 1987 Asian Club Championship winner, and Egyptian team Al-Ahly, the 1987 African Cup of Champions Clubs winner. 

The first leg was hosted by Yomiuri at the Nishigaoka Soccer Stadium in Tokyo on 2 September 1989, while the second leg was hosted by Al-Ahly at Cairo Stadium in Cairo on 22 September 1989.

Al-Ahly won the two legs, with a score on aggregate 4–1.

Teams

Match details

First leg

Second leg

References
 RSSSF

1988
Afro-Asian
Afro-Asian
Afro-Asian
Al Ahly SC matches
1989 in Japanese football
1989–90 in Egyptian football 
September 1989 sports events in Africa
September 1989 sports events in Asia
International club association football competitions hosted by Japan
International club association football competitions hosted by Egypt